Dana Anderson D'Abreo (born January 13, 1973 in Oshawa, Ontario) is a former field hockey player from Canada.

Anderson earned 57 caps for the Women's Senior National Team during her career. On national level Anderson, a resident of Etobicoke, Ontario, played for Ontario from age fifteen, and for the University of Toronto Varsity Blues from 1991-1996, winning CIAU Nationals in 1993 and 1996.

She is married to Men's National Team player Robin D'Abreo.

International senior tournaments
 1994 – World Cup, Dublin, Ireland (10th) 
 1995 – Pan American Games, Mar del Plata, Argentina (3rd)
 1995 – Olympic Qualifier, Cape Town, South Africa (7th) 
 1997 – World Cup Qualifier, Harare, Zimbabwe (11th)

External links
 
 

1973 births
Living people
Canadian female field hockey players
Field hockey people from Ontario
Field hockey players at the 1995 Pan American Games
Medalists at the 1995 Pan American Games
Pan American Games bronze medalists for Canada
Pan American Games medalists in field hockey
Sportspeople from Oshawa